EMP or Emp may refer to:

Science and technology
 Earth Microbiome Project
 Electromagnetic propulsion
 Electromagnetic pulse
 Electron microprobe
 Embden–Meyerhof pathway
 Estramustine phosphate
 Extended Mathematical Programming
 EMP1, a protein that in humans is encoded by the EMP1 gene
 EMP2, a protein that in humans is encoded by the EMP2 gene

Firearms
 EMP 44, a prototype, all-metal submachine gun produced by Erma Werke in 1943
 Erma EMP, a German submachine gun of the 1930s
 Springfield Armory EMP, an American semi-automatic pistol

Businesses  
 EMP Merchandising, a German company
 EMP Label Group, a record company
 Ericsson Mobile Platforms, a defunct telecommunications company
 Eleven Madison Park, a high-end restaurant in New York
 EMP, an intermodal container service co-run by Union Pacific and Norfolk Southern Railroad

Popular culture
 Lord Emp, a DC comic book character
 Empowered, the title character of the Empowered graphic novel series

Transport
 EMP, National Rail station code for Emerson Park railway station, London
 EMP, FAA location identifier of Emporia Municipal Airport, Kansas

Other uses 
 5001 EMP, a minor planet
 "Emp", nickname of David Peacock (American football) (1890–?), American college football player and coach and politician
 EMP Museum, now the Museum of Pop Culture, in Seattle, Washington
 Estado Mayor Presidencial, the former Mexican presidential guard
 emp, the ISO 639-3 code for the Northern Embera language
 Energy Modelling Platform, a European policy analysis initiative supported by the Horizon 2020 science funding program
 Efficient Modular Platform 2 (EMP2), a car platform developed by PSA Group